The deputy premier of British Columbia is the representative of the premier of British Columbia in the Canadian province of British Columbia when the current premier is unable to attend functions executed by the premier.

Mike Farnworth has been the deputy premier since October 28, 2021.

Deputy premiers of British Columbia

See also
 Premier (Canada)

References